Ziereis is a German surname. Notable people with the surname include:

Franz Ziereis (1905–1945), German Nazi SS concentration camp commandant
Markus Ziereis (born 1992), German footballer
Philipp Ziereis (born 1993), German footballer

German-language surnames